Tetranychus is a genus of spider mite. Tetranychus is one of the most economically important genera of mites, due to its high potential to destroy agriculture. It contains over 140 species, the most significant of which is Tetranychus urticae.

Selected species
Tetranychus lintearius
Tetranychus pacificus
Tetranychus urticae

References

Trombidiformes
Trombidiformes genera
Taxa named by Léon Jean Marie Dufour